Apios fortunei, commonly known as hodo, hodoimo, groundnut, or potatobean, is a tuber-forming member of the Bean family. It is a native plant of Eastern China and Japan.  It is one of three species in the genus Apios that are known to produce edible tubers, although it has generally been considered an emergency, or famine food or medicinal plant. A study done on the chemical composition of the tubers found that starch was the predominant carbohydrate, although smaller amounts of sucrose and glucose were found and almost no fructose was found. In the wild, Apios fortunei is often found near brooks. Apios fortunei is a perennial climbing vine. The leaves are pinnate with 3-7 leaflets and are ovate or lanceolate in shape, 3–7 cm long. Flowers have been variously described as whitish-green, light yellowish-green with a red purple edge on the wing petal, or sulphurous green with rosy wing petals. The flowers form pseudoracemes or terminal panicles, 6–26 cm long. The flowers are showy and have ornamental potential. Legume fruits are linear, 7–8 cm long and 5–6 mm wide.

References

Phaseoleae
Flora of China
Flora of Japan